Shuhan-e Olya (also Romanized as Shūhān-e ‘Olyā and Showhān-e ‘Olyā) is a village in Homeyl Rural District, Homeyl District, Eslamabad-e Gharb County, Kermanshah Province, Iran. At the 2006 census, its population was 35, in 8 families.

References 

Populated places in Eslamabad-e Gharb County